The 1947 The Citadel Bulldogs football team represented The Citadel, The Military College of South Carolina in the 1947 college football season.  J. Quinn Decker served as head coach for the second season.  The Bulldogs played as members of the Southern Conference and played home games at Johnson Hagood Stadium.

Schedule

References

Citadel Bulldogs
The Citadel Bulldogs football seasons
Citadel football